Jason Joel Desrouleaux (born September 21, 1989), known professionally as Jason Derulo (formerly stylized as Derülo), is an American singer and songwriter. Since the start of his solo recording career in 2009, he has sold over 250 million singles worldwide and has achieved eleven platinum singles including "Wiggle", "Talk Dirty", "Want to Want Me", "Trumpets", "It Girl", "In My Head", "Ridin' Solo", and "Whatcha Say".

After contributing and writing songs for various artists, Derulo signed to recording label Beluga Heights, owned by record producer and industry veteran J. R. Rotem. After Beluga Heights became part of the Warner Music Group, Derulo became a recording artist and released his debut single "Whatcha Say" in May 2009. It sold over five million digital downloads, gaining an RIAA certification of triple platinum, and reaching number one in the U.S. and New Zealand. Derulo released his second single, "In My Head", in December 2009 and his self-titled debut studio album Jason Derulo, followed on March 2, 2010. He released his second album, Future History, on September 16, 2011; the album was preceded by the release of the UK number-one single "Don't Wanna Go Home". Derulo's third international album, Tattoos, was released on September 24, 2013, and later repackaged as his third U.S. album, Talk Dirty, released on April 15, 2014. In 2015, Derulo released his single "Want to Want Me" and announced his fourth studio album, Everything Is 4, which was released on June 2, 2015.

In June 2020, Derulo released the single "Savage Love (Laxed – Siren Beat)" alongside beat producer Jawsh 685. The song went viral on TikTok and was later remixed by BTS, wherein the remix reached number one in the US, becoming Derulo's second chart-topper in the region. In November 2020, Derulo released another single entitled "Love Not War (The Tampa Beat)" featuring New Caledonian beat producer Nuka. It was inspired from the latter's SoundCloud track known as "The Tampa Beat" which was earlier released in 2018, and has been used in over 23 million TikTok videos.

Early life
Derulo was born in Miramar, Florida, the son of Haitian parents. Derulo's first language was Haitian Creole and his mother went to law school. He started singing at a young age. He attended performing arts schools in Florida and made some early attempts at music composition, writing his first song at the age of eight. His writing skills began attracting attention when he was a teenager. He also wrote "Bossy" for Birdman, a New Orleans-based rapper, and made a guest appearance on the song, highlighting his ability as a vocalist.

His stage name, "Derulo", is a pronunciation respelling of his surname, Desrouleaux.

Career

2006–2010: Beginnings and Jason Derulo

Derulo has been writing songs for artists including Diddy, Danity Kane, Donnie Klang, Sean Kingston, Cassie, and Lil Wayne since he was young, also intending on becoming a solo performer. After attending performing arts schools, such as The American Musical and Dramatic Academy, and honing his talents as a singer and dancer, as well as acting in theatre productions like Ragtime and Smokey Joe's Cafe, Derulo won the grand prize on the 2006 season finale of the TV show Showtime at the Apollo. Derulo was discovered by music producer J.R. Rotem, who signed him to his record label Beluga Heights Records and Warner Bros. Records.

In a HitQuarters interview, Rotem highlighted Derulo's dedication to his art by saying, "Jason Derulo has one of the most impressive work ethics I've ever come across – he just keeps knocking out songs in the studio. That's an amazing quality."

On August 4, 2009, Jason released his debut single, "Whatcha Say". It was produced by J.R. Rotem with additional production by Fuego. The track heavily samples the Imogen Heap song "Hide and Seek". In late August 2009, the song debuted at number 54 on the Billboard Hot 100 and hit number 1 in November 2009. It was Derulo's first number-one hit. The single's music video was released in September 2009; after the single became successful, Derulo began work on his debut album. He released the second single from his album, "In My Head", on December 8, 2009. It debuted at number 63 on the Billboard Hot 100, and reached number five.

Derulo's debut album, Jason Derulo, stylised with an umlaut as Jason Derülo, was released on March 2, 2010. Jason Derulo first charted within the top ten of the UK and Irish Albums Charts in early March 2010. He spent six weeks promoting the album in his appearances as one of the opening acts for Lady Gaga's 2009–2010 The Monster Ball Tour. The third single of the album is "Ridin' Solo", which was released worldwide on April 26, 2010. By July, the single had reached number nine in the Billboard Hot 100. Derulo has also been featured in a song by new artist Will Roush called "Turn it Up", which also features Stat Quo and Young Buck. He also collaborated with UK singer Pixie Lott on a song titled "Coming Home" from the re-released edition of her album Turn It Up.

2011–2012: Future History and other ventures

In 2011, Derulo recorded a track with Demi Lovato titled "Together" for her album Unbroken. His second studio album, Future History, was released on September 27, 2011. Derulo detailed his journey recording the album via a series of webisodes posted on his official website. Its lead single, "Don't Wanna Go Home", was released on May 20, 2011. It landed the number-one spot in the UK and in the top five in Australia. Derulo planned to embark on an eight-date UK tour in support of the album in February 2012, including a show at Wembley Arena on March 1. However, on January 3, 2012, while Derulo was rehearsing for his Future History Tour, he broke one of his vertebrae. As a result, he canceled all of his tour dates.

On March 28, 2012, Derulo appeared on American Idol to announce he would allow fans to help him finish the lyrics for a new song entitled "Undefeated", as part of a partnership with American Idol and Coca-Cola. Fans were given the opportunity to submit their own lyrics to complete the song, and fans were then given the chance to vote on which lyrics they liked the most. After doing an endurance test of 50 backflips in a row, Derulo broke his C2 vertebrate, also known as the hangman's break. On May 5, 2012, Derulo announced that his first post-neck injury television performance would be on the eleventh-season finale of American Idol, on May 22, 2012. In August 2012, Derulo became a dance master alongside Kelly Rowland, for the first season of the Australian dance talent show Everybody Dance Now. The show was cancelled shortly after its fourth episode aired due to poor ratings.

On July 9, 2012, Derulo announced that he had signed Australian singer-songwriter Arlene Zelina to his record label Future History (co-owned with his manager Frank Harris) after he attended one of her performances at Whisky a Go Go in 2011 before she returned to Melbourne, Australia. On July 10, 2012, Derulo confirmed this on his Twitter.

2013–2014: Tattoos and Talk Dirty

On April 16, 2013, Derulo released his single, "The Other Side" to radio on April 23, 2013. As of July 4, 2013 "The Other Side" peaked at No. 18 on the Billboard Hot 100. Derulo announced via Twitter that his third album would be called Tattoos. The album was released on September 24, 2013. The album's second single, "Talk Dirty", was released internationally on July 27, 2013 (digitally). "Talk Dirty" peaked at number three on the Billboard Hot 100.

The album features American hip-hop recording artist 2 Chainz; it is the first single from Derulo to contain a feature. The tracks accompanying music video had already been shot and was released in early August 2013.

"Marry Me" made its US radio premiere on On Air with Ryan Seacrest on August 26, 2013. It was scheduled to be released to all digital retailers as the second single to the U.S. market, third overall, on the same day. On December 11, 2013, he was the headline act for Radio City Live in the Echo Arena, Liverpool. He performed Ridin' Solo and Talk Dirty.

Six months after Derulo's third album Tattoos was released (other than in the U.S) he announced on March 18, 2014, that he would be releasing an album with 4 newly recorded songs and 7 from Tattoos as the U.S album and that it would have different artwork and be re-titled Talk Dirty. Talk Dirty was released on April 15, 2014. That same day, Jason Derulo released the special edition of Tattoos in the UK, which included the 4 new songs from the Talk Dirty album.

On November 21, 2014, Pitbull released a song off the album Globalization featuring Jason Derulo and Juicy J titled "Drive You Crazy", which was later to become a single on August 21, 2015.

2015–2016: Everything Is 4
On January 22, 2015, Dick Clark Productions announced that Derulo would be a judge in the upcoming 12th season of So You Think You Can Dance, alongside new judge Paula Abdul and returning judge Nigel Lythgoe. "I am truly excited, and eagerly look forward to joining the cast of So You Think You Can Dance," said Derulo. "It is one of the most respected and longest-tenured shows on network television, and I hope to be a part of new growth and continued success."

On March 9, Derulo released the first single from his forthcoming fourth studio album, Everything Is 4, called "Want to Want Me". "Want To Want Me" became the most-added track in the history of Top 40 radio: it was added to 156 monitored pop stations, making it the biggest Top 40 US radio launch thus far. It peaked at number five on the Billboard Hot 100 and topped the UK Singles Chart. The music video for his second single, "Cheyenne", was released on June 30, 2015.

On June 29, Derulo announced the release of his first greatest hits album, titled Platinum Hits. Platinum Hits was released on July 29, 2016, with a brand-new song called "Kiss the Sky", which appears on the soundtrack to the film Storks. The album features 11 platinum certified singles.

On September 28, 2016, Derulo guest starred in an episode of the Fox drama Lethal Weapon.

2017–present: 2Sides, Cats and departure from Warner Music
On February 24, 2017, Derulo released a new single entitled "Swalla", featuring Nicki Minaj and Ty Dolla $ign. On March 17, Pitbull and Derulo released the song "Educate Ya", from the former's album Climate Change. On March 31, Cheyenne Frontier Days announced they added Jason Derulo to their 2017 Frontier Nights concert lineup on Friday, July 28, 2017. At the 2017 Billboard Music Awards on May 21, Derulo announced that his next studio album would be titled 777. ""If I'm Lucky" was then released on September 1. "Tip Toe" (featuring French Montana) was released soon after, on November 10. "Swalla" and "Tip Toe" were expected to be included on the album, according to Derulo. The album was later renamed 2Sides. Derulo explains the reason why he changed the album's name, saying:

"Goodbye", a joint-collaboration with David Guetta and featuring Nicki Minaj and Willy William, was released on August 24, 2018. In 2019, Derulo released the singles "Let's Shut Up & Dance" with Lay Zhang and NCT 127 on February 22, "Mamacita", featuring Farruko, on July 5, and "Too Hot" on August 27.

In a telephone interview with the Official Charts Company, Derulo revealed that he will release "a seven-track EP and then another one shortly after", and that his previous singles "Swalla", "If I'm Lucky", "Tip Toe", and "Goodbye" will not be included on this project because "those songs have had their time. Even though putting them on an album would make it go platinum in two seconds, it’s not about the numbers. These are brand new songs, brand new vibes." Side 1, the first part of 2Sides, was released on November 8, 2019; with Part 2 arriving in 2020. Derulo stars as Rum Tum Tugger in the film Cats, which premiered on December 20, 2019. He will also star as Isley Brothers frontman Ron Isley in the upcoming biographical film Spinning Gold.

In May 2020, Derulo confirmed that after a lengthy negotiation, he had left his record contract with Warner Bros. Records due to creative differences. By leaving the label, Derulo also cancelled the release of 2Sides (Side 2), but confirmed that new music would arrive later in 2020.
In June 2020, "Savage Love (Laxed – Siren Beat)" by Derulo and Jawsh 685 went viral on TikTok, eventually peaking at number one in the UK, becoming Derulo's 5th number one in the country. The song was originally released without properly clearing and attributing a prominent sample in the song to Jawsh 685. The clearance issue was resolved and the song was eventually re-released and credited to both artists. 
The song was later on remixed by BTS, wherein the remix reached number one on the Billboard Hot 100, becoming Derulo's second chart topper in the region (his first since "Whatcha Say" in 2009, the longest time in between number-one hits for male artists since Dr. Dre's "Crack a Bottle" reached number one after a 12-year hiatus in 2009).

In May 2021, Derulo featured on the remix of "Jalebi Baby" by Indian-Canadian singer Tesher.

On September 3, 2021, Derulo released his new single "Acapulco".

In March 2023, Derulo was announced as a judge for the Australian version of the singing competition, The Voice, replacing Keith Urban.

Artistry
Derulo's music is generally pop, but also incorporates R&B and hip-hop influences. He has predominantly named Michael Jackson as his inspiration. Derulo states "He is the reason I am who I am today. When I was 4 years old, I saw him for the first time. I saw how he moved the crowd and how people were just so touched". His other musical influences include Elvis Presley, Madonna, Prince, Usher and Justin Timberlake. Billboards Jason Lipshutz speaks on his overall music and sound stating he operates "in two musical modes", describing one as "positive PG-romance dance-pop personality", and the other as a "bumping, faux-crass club thumpers". He explained that "Derulo has been tweaking his two modes just enough as they are used to offset each other, so that audiences never grew sick of either style".

Personal life
Derulo and singer Jordin Sparks dated for three years, before ending their relationship in September 2014. On May 8, 2021, he had a son with his girlfriend Jena Frumes. The couple broke up on September 23, 2021.

Derulo's TikTok account is the 15th most-followed account on the platform.

Derulo has three nieces.

Discography

 Jason Derulo (2010)
 Future History (2011)
 Tattoos (2013) / Talk Dirty (2014) 
 Everything Is 4 (2015)

Tours
 AOL AIM presents: Jason Derülo (2010–11)
 Tattoos World Tour (2014)
 Talk Dirty Tour (2014–15)
 Everything Is 4 Tour (2016)
 2Sides World Tour (2018–19)

Filmography

Awards and nominations

References

External links

 
 

 
1989 births
Living people
21st-century American singers
American male pop singers
American male singer-songwriters
American male dancers
American people of Haitian descent
American contemporary R&B singers
Everybody Dance Now
Musicians from Miami
People from Miramar, Florida
Singer-songwriters from Florida
Asylum Records artists
Atlantic Records artists
Warner Records artists
American Musical and Dramatic Academy alumni
Dance-pop musicians